IMUnified, formed in 2000, is a coalition of companies that intend to develop open standards for instant messaging (IM). The founding members are AT&T, Excite@Home, iCAST, Microsoft, Odigo, Phone.com, Prodigy, Tribal Voice and Yahoo!. Notably absent from the list of members is AOL, who was not invited to join the coalition. Some analysts believe the goal of the coalition was to try to force AOL toward a more open IM standard.

See also
 IMUnited

External links
 AOL not invited to IMUnified alliance, ZDNet (July 26, 2000).
 Leading Technology and Instant Messaging Companies for IMUnited, mobile.com.
 Trillian restores AOL IM connection, CNN (February 26, 2002).

Instant messaging